The 2016 Northeast Conference men's basketball tournament was held from March 2–8, 2016. The tournament featured the league's top eight seeds, with higher seed hosting all games. The winners of the tournament, Fairleigh Dickinson, will receive the conference's automatic bid to the 2016 NCAA Tournament. This is Fairleigh Dickinson's fifth Championship.

Format
For the twelfth straight year, the NEC Men’s Basketball Tournament consisted of an eight-team playoff format with all games played at the home of the higher seed. After the quarterfinals, the teams were reseeded so the highest remaining seed plays the lowest remaining seed in the semifinals.

Seeds
Teams were seeded based on the final regular season standings, with ties broken under an NEC policy.

Bracket
Teams were reseed after each round with highest remaining seeds receiving home court advantage.

All games will be played at the venue of the higher seed

Game summaries

Quarterfinals: #1 Wagner vs. #8 Robert Morris
Series History: Robert Morris leads 41–28

Quarterfinals: #2 Fairleigh Dickinson vs. #7 Saint Francis (PA) 
Series History: Fairleigh Dickinson leads 44–40

Quarterfinals: #3 Sacred Heart vs. #6 LIU Brooklyn
Series History: LIU Brooklyn leads 20–11

Quarterfinals: #4 St. Francis Brooklyn vs. #5 Mount St. Mary's
Series History: Mount St. Mary's leads 30–26

Semifinal: #1 Wagner vs. #6 LIU Brooklyn
Series History: Wagner leads 40–39

Semifinal: #2 Fairleigh Dickinson vs. #5 Mount St. Mary's
Series History: Fairleigh Dickinson leads 27–23

Championship: #1 Wagner 79 vs. #2 Fairleigh Dickinson 87
Series History:  Fairleigh Dickinson leads 41–37

*All times EST

All-tournament team
Tournament MVP in bold.

References

Northeast Conference men's basketball tournament
Tournament
Northeast Conference men's basketball tournament
Northeast Conference men's basketball tournament